Leander Ditscheiner (4 January 1839 – 1 February 1905) was an Austrian physicist and mathematician, best known for his research on birefringence.

Life and work
Leander Ditscheiner was born 1839 in Vienna. He studied at the University of Vienna and later at the University of Heidelberg. He received his Ph.D. in 1857 and became lecturer at the Vienna University of Technology in 1866. In the later years he became assistant professor and full professor in 1883.

References

1839 births
1905 deaths
19th-century Austrian physicists